Alan Warwick Palmer (1926 – 25 March 2022) was a British author of historical and biographical books.

Background
Palmer was educated at Bancroft's School, Woodford Green, London, and Oriel College, Oxford. He spent 19 years as senior history teacher at Highgate School before becoming a full-time writer and researcher. His late wife, Veronica Palmer collaborated on several of his books.

Personal life
Palmer died on 25 March 2022, at the age of 95.

Honours and awards
He was elected a Fellow of the Royal Society of Literature in 1980.

Bibliography

Biographies
 Twilight of the Habsburgs: The Life and Times of Emperor Francis Joseph (1997). .
 A Brief History of Napoleon in Russia
 Kings and Queens of England
 Napoleon & Marie Louise: the Emperor's second wife
 Bernadotte: Napoleon's Marshal, Sweden's King
 The Life and Times of George IV
 Metternich (1972)
  Metternich. Der Staatsmann Europas (1977; 1986). .
 Alexander I: Tsar of war and peace
  Alexander I. Gegenspieler Napoleons (1984). .
  Alexander I. Der rätselhafte Zar, Ullstein, Berlin (1994). .
 The Kaiser: Warlord of the Second Reich (1978). .
 Bismarck
 Kemal Atatürk (Makers of the 20th Century)
 Princes of Wales
 The Royal House of Greece
 The Chancelleries of Europe
 Franz Joseph I
 Frederick The Great
 Sam Boyce (Australia)

History
 The Decline and Fall of the Ottoman Empire (1993). .
  Verfall und Untergang des Osmanischen Reiches (1997). .
 Victory, 1918
 Nations and empires
 Age of optimism
 The gardeners of Salonika
 Russia in War and Peace London: Weidenfeld & Nicolson (1972). .
 The Baltic: A New History of the Region and Its People
 Northern Shores: A History of the Baltic Sea and Its Peoples (2005). . (2006). .
 Napoleon in Russia
 Napoleon's Russian Campaign (2003). .
 Banner of Battle: Story of the Crimean War (1987). .
 East End: Four Centuries of London Life (1989) ISBN 978-0-7195-4676-1. (2000). . (2004). .
 The Salient (2007). .

Reference works
 A Dictionary of Modern History, 1789–1945 (1964).
 A military atlas of the First World War (1975, with Arthur Banks). .
 Who's Who in Shakespeare's England (1981). .
 The Penguin Dictionary of Twentieth Century History (2nd ed., 1983). .
 Penguin Dictionary of Modern History, 1789–1945
 Quotations in History: A Dictionary of Historical Quotations
 Who's Who in Modern History
 An Encyclopaedia of Napoleon's Europe (1984). .
 The Facts on File Dictionary of 20th Century History
 Dictionary of the British Empire and Commonwealth
 Who's Who in World Politics
 A Dictionary of Modern Politics
 The Chronology of British History

References

External links 
 

1926 births
2022 deaths
Historians of Europe
Information and reference writers
English biographers
Fellows of the Royal Society of Literature
People educated at Bancroft's School
Alumni of Oriel College, Oxford
Historians of the Napoleonic Wars